Xuxa só para Baixinhos 7 - Brincadeiras (also known as XSPB 7) is the thirtieth studio album and the twenty-third in Portuguese of singer and Brazilian TV host Xuxa, released by Som Livre on July 7, 2007. It is the seventh album in the collection Só Para Baixinhos.

Release and reception
Xuxa só para Baixinhos 7 - Brincadeiras was released on July 7, 2007 by Som Livre. The album sold another 50,000 copies, reaching the 8th position of the bestselling DVDs in the year 2007. The singles were "Pique Alto", "Dança das Cadeiras" and "Bambolê". The album was also released in a premium kit, which came with the CD, DVD Gifts, the gifts are three games: Board Game and Memory Game. At the end of 2014, XSPBs 6, 7 and 8 were released on Blu-ray by Som Livre.

Tour
The XSPB 7 tour was scheduled for 2008, shortly after the end of the Xuxa Festa tour in May 2008, however the project was canceled and the Xuxa Festa tour continued until October 2009 in November 2007, Xuxa arrived singing excerpts from the songs of XSPB 7 on the tour as "Pique-Alto" and talked to the audience as she wanted it to go on tour.

Track listing

Personnel
Art Direction: Xuxa Meneghel
Direction: Paulo de Barros
Cinematography: André Horta
Producers: Luiz Cláudio Moreira and Mônica Muniz
Musical production: Ary Sperling
Production Director: Junior Porto
Production assistant: Mariana de Aquino
Cover and Ente: Felipe Gois
Set design: Lueli Antunes
Characters: Bila Bilu, Tutxutxução, Ratinha Rosa, Ratinha Amarela, Ratinho Azul, Xuxinha and Guto

Certifications

References

External links 
 Xuxa só para Baixinhos 7 at Discogs

2007 albums
2007 video albums
Xuxa albums
Xuxa video albums
Children's music albums by Brazilian artists
Portuguese-language video albums
Portuguese-language albums
Som Livre albums